Barton le Street  railway station, served the village of Barton le Street, in North Yorkshire, England. It was located on the Thirsk and Malton railway line which ran between the two towns.

History

Opened by the York, Newcastle and Berwick Railway in May 1853, it was then absorbed by the North Eastern Railway. In 1923, the station became part of the London and North Eastern Railway during the Grouping. By the time the company closed the station to passengers in 1930, the passenger service had been downgraded to run between Malton and Gilling only, although the goods services continued as with the rest of the line until final closure in August 1964.

References

Bibliography

External links 

 Station on navigable O.S. map.
 Barton le Street on Disused Stations

Disused railway stations in North Yorkshire
Former North Eastern Railway (UK) stations
Railway stations in Great Britain opened in 1853
Railway stations in Great Britain closed in 1931